The Fort Nelson River, often shortened to simply the  Nelson River, is in north-eastern British Columbia, Canada. It flows  generally north-westward to the Liard River, a tributary of the Mackenzie River, which empties into the Arctic Ocean. These, along with the Sahtaneh and Muskwa Rivers, constitute the major tributaries. The source of the Sikanni Chief, on the eastern slope of the Rocky Mountains, is ultimately the headwater of the Fort Nelson River.

The land through which the river flows is generally flat, a mixture of boreal forests and muskeg. The area is rich in wildlife, and forestry and mining (especially oil and gas) are major industries.

History 
The river has a rich history.  The Dene and Sekani First Nations used it for food and trade.  The river itself is named for the town of Fort Nelson, established in 1805 by the North West Company as a fur trading post near the river's junction with the Muskwa River.  With the abandonment of the village and trading post at Nelson Forks and Fort Nelson's relocation roughly eight kilometres southwest up the Muskwa River to better access the Alaska Highway built in the 1940s, there are no longer any communities along this river.

It flows north-west and north, and its course is paralleled by BC Rail tracks north of Fontas. It receives waters from the Elleh Creek and Klua Creek, then follows a north-west direction, a short distance from Andy Bailey Provincial Park. It turns north again near Fort Nelson, where the Muskwa River flows into it.

Further north it receives the McConachie Creek, Cridland Creek and Sahtaneh River, which also carries waters from the Snake River. It then turns north-west and west, where it receives the Shush Creek, Onion Creek, Tsimeh Creek, Stanolind Creek and Kiwigana River. It is then crossed by the Liard Highway and continues westwards, receiving waters from Tsoo Creek, Etane Creek, Obole Creek and Capot-Blanc Creek.

Its waters are carried up the Liard River then the Mackenzie River, into the Arctic Ocean.

Local disagreement 
Locally, particularly among the Dene and Cree population of Fort Nelson First Nation it is taught that the Fort Nelson River is not formed by the confluence of the Fontas and Sikinni Chief Rivers, but is instead formed further downriver by the Sikinni Chief's meeting with the larger Muskwa River, notably the former location of Fort Nelson, the community from which the river takes its name. The site was largely abandoned in favour of the community's current location and the nearby Fort Nelson First Nation reserve in the decades following the Second World War as the Alaska Highway usurped the river systems' place as the area's prime means of transportation. The discrepancy in beliefs is believed to trace back to the various surveyors who explored the land in the 19th and early 20th centuries, their work developing into the official view of the Fort Nelson River and its course, which can be seen on most maps and other documentation today, though the official view is often ignored locally.

Tributaries 
From headwaters to mouth, the Fort Nelson River receives the following tributaries:

Sikanni Chief River
Fontas River
Elleh Creek
Klua Creek
Muskwa River
McConachie Creek
Cridland Creek
Snake River
Hoffard Creek
Chuatse Creek
Utahn Creek
Sahtaneh River
Lichen Creek
Gunnell Creek
Courvoisier Creek
Komie Creek
Shush Creek
Onion Creek
Tsimeh Creek
Stanolind Creek
Kiwigana River
Tsoo Creek
Etane Creek
Obole Creek
Capot-Blanc Creek

References 

Rivers of British Columbia
Fort Nelson Country
Tributaries of the Liard River
Peace River Land District